Marion Township, Ohio may refer to:

 Marion Township, Allen County, Ohio
 Marion Township, Clinton County, Ohio
 Marion Township, Fayette County, Ohio
 Marion Township, Franklin County, Ohio (defunct, now part of Columbus)
 Marion Township, Hancock County, Ohio
 Marion Township, Hardin County, Ohio
 Marion Township, Henry County, Ohio
 Marion Township, Hocking County, Ohio
 Marion Township, Marion County, Ohio
 Marion Township, Mercer County, Ohio
 Marion Township, Morgan County, Ohio
 Marion Township, Noble County, Ohio
 Marion Township, Pike County, Ohio

Ohio township disambiguation pages